Punctidae, common name the "dot snails" or "pinhead snails", is a family of minute air-breathing land snails, terrestrial pulmonate gastropod mollusks or micromollusks in the informal group Sigmurethra (according to the taxonomy of the Gastropoda by Bouchet & Rocroi, 2005).

Genera 
The family Punctidae has no subfamilies (according to the taxonomy of the Gastropoda by Bouchet & Rocroi, 2005).

The family Punctidae includes the following genera:
 Allenella Iredale, 1944
 Charopinesta Iredale, 1944
 Dignamoconcha Iredale, 1944
 Goweriana Shea & Griffiths, 2010
 Paralaoma Iredale, 1913
 Pernastela Iredale, 1944
 Phrixgnathus Hutton, 1882
 Punctum Morse, 1864
 Semilaoma Iredale, 1944
 and others

References

External links